Barney's Big Surprise (also known as La Gran Sorpresa de Barney in Latin America) was Barney the Dinosaur's first national tour. The show started in 1996 and played in 60 cities, with a program of 28 old and new Barney songs.  Originally planned for theaters (and modeled after the earlier Barney Live in New York City at Radio City Music Hall in New York City), it was revised to become more like a rock concert for young children; most of the venues were small arenas with around 5,000 seats, with some larger arenas used as well.  A video of the show, which had been taped at the Lawrence Joel Veterans Memorial Coliseum, was released in 1998.

Cast
The cast list below is taken from the video release and does not show all cast members that have performed in this show.

 Barney (suit) – Carey Stinson/Josh Martin
 Barney (voice) – Bob West
 Baby Bop (suit) – Lee Clark/Jennifer Romano
 Baby Bop (voice) – Julie Johnson
 B.J. (suit) – Kyle Nelson/Pat O'Connoll
 B.J. (voice) – Patty Wirtz

Additional cast
 Professor Tinkerputt – Barry Pearl
 Mother Goose – Michelle McCarel
 Old King Cole – Dewayne Hambrick
 Kevin – Brent Love
 Cindy – Mallory Lineberger
 Rachel – Vanessa Lauren
 Tony – Trent Gentry

Songs

Act 1 songs
 Barney Is A Dinosaur
 If You're Happy And You Know It
 Welcome To Our Treehouse
 The Baby Bop Hop
 Happy Birthday To Me
 The Airplane Song
 My Kite
 Car Sing-Along Medley (In The Car And Having Fun, Itsy Bitsy Spider, and Mister Sun)
 Mr. Knickerbocker
 Tinkerputt's Song
 We Are Little Robots
 The Rainbow Song

Act 2 songs
 Hey Look At Me! I Can Fly!
 Ducks That I Once Knew
 Happy Birthday To Me (reprise)
 If All The Raindrops
 Old McDonald Had a Farm
 I'm Mother Goose
 Nursery-Rhyme Medley (Humpty Dumpty, Hey Diddle Diddle, Little Miss Muffet, Little Boy Blue, 1, 2, Buckle My Shoe, Sing A Song Of Sixpence)
 Old King Cole
 Happy Birthday To You
 I Love You

Reception
Los Angeles Times critic Lynne Heffley noted that the "feel-good formula" for the stage show was similar to a Barney television episode: "hugging, singing, dancing, more hugging and a little advice", and she found the result to be "lively, expertly staged and a lavish visual treat", although she suggested earplugs given the loud volumes.  In the Chicago Tribune, Eric Fidler commented that "Judging Barney through the eyes of an adult is pointless. For an adult unable to relax and suspend judgment, the show was a vision of some twisted hell. But kids were in heaven."

References

Barney & Friends
Mattel Creations films
1998 direct-to-video films
American direct-to-video films
1990s English-language films